Aethria splendens is a moth of the subfamily Arctiinae. It was described by Peter Jörgensen in 1935. It is found in Paraguay.

References

Moths described in 1935
Arctiinae
Moths of South America